Pterolophia lepida is a species of beetle in the family Cerambycidae. It was described by Breuning in 1938. It is known from the Ivory Coast, the Central African Republic, Cameroon, and the Republic of the Congo. It feeds on Celtis zenkeri. It contains the varietas Pterolophia lepida var. szewezycki.

References

lepida
Beetles described in 1938